Ethiopia–Russia relations are the relations between the two countries, Ethiopia and Russia. Both countries established diplomatic relations on April 21, 1943. Russia currently has an embassy in Addis Ababa, and Ethiopia has an embassy in Moscow. The Ethiopian ambassador to Russia is also accredited to Armenia, Azerbaijan, Belarus, Georgia, Kazakhstan, Kyrgyzstan, Moldova, Tajikistan, Turkmenistan, Ukraine, and Uzbekistan.

History

Pre-Soviet Union

Early contacts
The first contacts between Russians and Ethiopians took place in the Palestine, where Russian pilgrims met the Ethiopian religious community. Around 1370, the Russian pilgrim Agrefeny described the performance of Ethiopian rites in the Church of the Holy Sepulchre. In the 1470s, Afanasy Nikitin passed through what is today Eritrea on his way back from India, becoming the first Russian to set foot in Ethiopian lands.

Imperial history
The history of this relationship has its origins in the 19th century. Russia's first steps in the Horn of Africa were taken by a Cossack adventurer named N.I. Ashinov, who attempted to establish a "New Moscow" at the coastal town of Sagallo in modern-day Djibouti. This short-lived settlement came to an end in February 1889 when French authorities removed the 175 Russian settlers. While Ashniov had never more than lukewarm support from the Russian Tsar, a delegation led by V.F. Mashkov to Emperor Menelik II in October 1889 was official. Mashkov discussed arms sales to Ethiopia with the Ethiopian emperor, and upon returning to Russia he was decorated by the Tsar. Mashkov made a second visit to Ethiopia early in 1891 under the sponsorship of the Imperial Russian Geographical Society. Paul Henze notes that the reasons of Mashkov's visits were "no doubt political, but the fact that both countries were Orthodox encouraged favorable attitudes on both sides."

Russia provided the mountain guns the Ethiopian army used in the 1896 Battle of Adwa.

A permanent Russian diplomatic presence was established in Addis Ababa in 1902.

Soviet Union

Early Soviet relations

The Soviet Union was one of only five nations which refused to acknowledge Italy's occupation of Ethiopia. Official diplomatic relations between the two countries were established on 21 April 1943 during World War II.

1974 revolution 
Ethiopia established friendly relations with the Soviet Union following a 1974 uprising that forced the long serving Emperor Haile Selassie to cede power to a military council called the Derg ("Committee" in Ge'ez). Despite the implementation of a series of radical socio-economic reforms, Moscow was slow to embrace the new regime for several reasons. First, the Derg continued the old regime's policy of buying arms from the United States. Second, the Soviet Union was reluctant to jeopardize its growing relationship with Somalia, Ethiopia's traditional enemy. Third, a significant segment of the Soviet leadership was skeptical of the revolutionary credentials of the Derg, as Moscow perceived a significant number of its members to be pro-Western.

Soviet backing for the Derg increased as Major Mengistu Haile Mariam emerged as its most powerful member. In 1975, the first group of officers from the regime traveled to the Soviet Union for ideological training, including Lt. Colonel Fikre-Selassie Wogderess, who would later become Mengistu's second in command.  Soviet media ran positive portrayals of the Derg and of Mengistu in particular. After the execution of Mengistu's rival, Major Sisal Habte, Soviet support for the regime grew substantially, beginning with a secret $100 million arms deal in December 1976. In May 1977, Mengistu traveled to Moscow to sign a "Declaration on the Principles of Friendly Relations and Cooperation" and to conclude a second arms deal worth about $385 million.

Ogaden War 

Moscow's public embrace of Mengistu concerned Siad Barre's regime in Somalia, who worried about the implications of friendly Soviet-Ethiopian relations on their own alliance with the USSR. After rejecting a Soviet proposal for a four-nation Marxist–Leninist confederation, the Somali government launched an offensive in July 1977 with the intent of capturing Ethiopia's Ogaden region, starting the Ogaden War. Though Somalia appeared to be on the brink of victory after gaining control of 90% of the area, the Ethiopians were able to launch a counter offensive with the help of newly arrived Soviet arms and a South Yemeni brigade. Infuriated by Soviet support for the Ethiopians, Somalia annulled its treaty with the Soviet Union and expelled all Soviet advisors in the country. Consequently, the USSR orchestrated a massive transport of armaments, Cuban combat troops and Soviet military advisors to Ethiopia. By March 1978, Somali forces had been pushed out of the Ogaden.

1978–1985 

Following the Ogaden War, the Soviet Union strengthened its ties to Ethiopia. Moscow provided the Derg with more than $11 billion in military aid, leading to the creation of the largest army in sub-Saharan Africa. Soviet support was critical in the continuing suppression of Eritrean and Tigrean separatists. The USSR established naval, air and land bases in Ethiopia, notably facilities for naval reconnaissance flights in Asmara. Politically, the Soviet Union pushed Mengistu to develop a "national-democratic" regime, along the lines of the Eastern European countries. This was something he did reluctantly, as the Workers' Party of Ethiopia was not established until 1984. Economically, the Soviets provided limited credits to develop basic industries such as utilities. A significant number of Soviet professionals such as doctors and engineers also traveled to Ethiopia.

Soviet "New Thinking" 

Soviet policy towards Ethiopia remained relatively unchanged until the accession of Mikhail Gorbachev to General Secretary of the Communist Party of the Soviet Union in 1985. The new Soviet leader sought to reduce East-West tensions in order to pursue domestic political and economic reforms. To this end, Gorbachev called for "the just political settlement of international crisis and regional conflicts" at the 27th Congress of the Communist Party in March 1986. Soviet intellectuals began to question Moscow's support of socialist leaders who did not have popular support. Gorbachev's de-ideologization of Soviet foreign relations led many Soviet observers to view Mengistu less as the leader of a Leninist vanguard and more as an ineffective dictator struggling to maintain power at Moscow's expense.

Signs of Gorbachev's "new thinking" were evident in Ethiopian relations as early as 1986, when the Soviets pressured Mengistu to agree to face-to-face talks with Somalia's Siad Barre that resulted in the signing of peace accords in 1988. Similarly, Moscow indicated to Mengistu that the arms agreement reached in November 1987 was to be the last of its kind. Despite the urging of Soviet advisers, Mengistu resisted implementing political and economic reforms and banned discussion of perestroika and glasnost from Ethiopian media. It was not until the collapse of the hardline communist regimes in Eastern Europe in late 1989 that Mengistu proposed limited economic liberalization.

The drop of substantial Soviet military support after 1987 had consequences. Eritrean and Tigrean insurgents began to make advances, placing the Addis regime in an increasingly tenuous position. By mid-1989, Moscow was significantly cutting back weapon deliveries and advised Mengistu to seek a negotiated settlement. In July 1989, the head of the Soviet Foreign Ministry's African Department, Yuri Yukalov, met with Eritrean representatives in London in an attempt to advance the peace process. In September 1989, the Soviet Deputy Minister of Defense, General V. Varennikov, delivered a message to Mengistu from Gorbachev confirming Moscow's decision to end military aid to Ethiopia. In early 1990, the Soviet Union sought to further its disengagement from Ethiopia by welcoming the entry of the United States into the diplomatic process. This included mediation between the regime and the Eritrea People's Liberation Front by American Assistant Secretary of State for African Affairs Herman Cohen. These talks collapsed when the Ethiopian insurgents, under the umbrella grouping known as the Ethiopian People's Revolutionary Democratic Front, advanced into the capital and overthrew the regime in May 1991, forcing Mengistu into exile in Zimbabwe.

Current relations
During the Ethiopian-Eritrean War of the 1990s, Russia provided fighter jets and pilots to the then Ethiopian Air Force. 

During the Tigray War, Russian Foreign Minister Lavrov said the issue was an internal affair of Ethiopia and that Russia supported the Ethiopian government's efforts. The two sides also expressed the need to strengthen exchanges and cooperation in the fields of education, science and technology. Ethiopia abstained in the UN vote condemning Russia's invasion of Ukraine, Ethiopians also queued up to volunteer for Russia's side during the Russo-Ukrainian War.

See also
 Soviet Union-Africa relations
List of ambassadors of Russia to Ethiopia

Russians in Ethiopia
 Leonid Artamonov
 Nikolay Leontiev
 Nikolay Gumilev
 Alexander Bulatovich was a Russian military officer, explorer of Ethiopia, writer, hieromonk and the leader of the imiaslavie movement in Eastern Orthodox Christianity.
 - Who is the count Аbay?
 Cossacks of the emperor Menelik II
 Диссертация "Российско-эфиопские дипломатические и культурные связи в конце XIX-начале XX веков"

Further reading

References

Bibliography

 Tareke, Gebru. "The Ethiopia-Somalia war of 1977 revisited." International Journal of African Historical Studies 33.3 (2000): 635-667. online

External links

  Documents on the Ethiopia–Russia relationship from the Russian Ministry of Foreign Affairs
"U.S. to Test Soviet 'New Thinking': Talks on Africa," The Christian Science Monitor, May 4, 1989.

 
Africa–Russia relations
Russia
Bilateral relations of Russia